Panzer Leader may refer to:

 Panzer Leader (book), by Generaloberst Heinz Guderian
 Panzer Leader (game), a board game from Avalon Hill